Zinc Finger Protein 821, also known as ZNF821, is a protein encoded by the ZNF821 gene. This gene is located on the 16th chromosome and is expressed highly in the testes, moderately expressed in the brain and low expression in 23 other tissues. The protein encoded is 412 amino acids long with 2 Zinc Finger motifs (C2H2 type) and a 23 amino acid long STPR domain.

Gene

Locus 
ZNF821 is located at 16q22.2 on the minus strand, it is composed of 35,657 bases spanning from base 71,893,583 to 71,929,239. ZNF821 has 8 exons and is located in the same neighborhood as 4 other genes, ATXNL1, IST1, PKD1L3, AP1G1.

Transcriptional Regulation 
Transcription of ZNF821 is handled by the promoter GXP_9784938 which is 539 bases long and located from base 71,884,046 to 71,884,585. The promoter region begins 404 base pairs upstream of the beginning of transcription. Several transcription factors with scores greater than 0.9 are predicted to regulate ZNF821 expression.

Expression 
ZNF821 is highly expressed in the testes, almost 2.5 times as much as in the brain, the next most highly expressed in tissue. Expression in the brain is primarily during fetal development, with lower levels of expression occurring in the cerebellum. There are low levels of expression in most other tissues.

mRNA

Variants and Isoforms 
ZNF821 has 7 different transcript variants and 4 isoforms. Variant 1 Isoform 1 is the second longest and but most abundant of all the variants and isoforms. While variant 2 is longer, it contains one fewer exon. Variant 1, Isoform 1 is 1987 bases long with a 5' UTR 415 bases long and a 3' UTR 433 bases long.

Protein

Characteristics 
The protein encoded by the ZNF821 gene is 412 amino acids long with a calculated molecular weight of ~ 47 kDa and a predicted isoelectric point of 6.14. Compared to the rest of the human proteome, there are decreased amounts of Isoleucine and Tyrosine residues as well as increased levels of Arginine residues.

Structure 

ZNF821 protein contains two C2H2 Zinc Finger motifs (spanning amino acids 120-140 and 152-172, respectively) and an STPR (one-score-and-three-amino acid peptide repeat) domain (spanning amino acids 223-314) containing a bipartite nuclear localization signal. This STPR domain is a double-stranded DNA-binding domain with similar traits to the silkworm FMBP-1 STPR domain and is thought to be responsible for the nuclear localization of the ZNF821 protein. The secondary structure of the ZNF821 protein is composed of several alpha helical structures along with two small regions of beta sheets. The tertiary structure of the ZNF821 protein provides exposure of the Zinc Fingers for presumed DNA-binding.

Cellular Localization 
The ZNF821 protein binds to DNA making it highly likely to be localized to the nucleus, there is also a bipartite nuclear localization sequence from Lys280 to Arg297, Lys304 to Leu320, and Lys338 to Arg354. An analysis of the subcellular localization in both close and distant orthologs resulted in a >99% chance of being localized to the nucleus for all orthologs.

Regulation 
The ZNF821 protein is predicted to be modified post-translationally at several different positions. When compared with both close and distant orthologous sequences two phosphorylation sites are conserved, the Serine at position 2 and the Threonine at position 7. It is also predicted by several sources to have further phosphorylation sites of the Serine at position 254 and the Tyrosine at position 279.

Interactions 
Several proteins have been shown to interact with the ZNF821 protein, many of them relating to transcriptional regulation.

Homology

Paralogs 
ZNF821 has no paralogs in humans.

Orthologs 
There are orthologs for ZNF821 across vertebrates, but none for the protein in invertebrates. The Zinc Finger motifs are conserved into invertebrates. The STPR domain is only present in mammals.    

The relative rate of divergence is slow when compared to the rates of two reference proteins, Cytochrome c and Fibrinogen alpha , but increases to slightly faster than Cytochrome c as the date of divergence gets closer to the present.

Clinical Significance 
ZNF821 has been associated in some capacity with several different diseases and conditions. It has been implicated in causing craniosynostosis through interactions with the transcription factor BCL11B by affecting the charges on the arginine-3, arginine-5, and lysine-3 residues, thereby increasing their conformational flexibility. It has also been found to be a possible biomarker for methamphetamine-associated psychosis (MAP) via the process of RNA-degradation. Another disease association is that with breast cancer as part of a DNA-repair sub network. ZNF821 was found to be dysregulated among breast cancer patients. Finally, there is a study showing an increase in methylation over time on ZNF821 in Parkinson’s disease patients who did not receive L-dopa/entacapone. This provides a clearer view of changes due only to Parkinson’s pathophysiology.

References 

Proteins